Clarendon College may refer to:

 Clarendon College (Jamaica), a religious school in Clarendon parish, Jamaica
 Clarendon College (Texas), a two-year college in Clarendon, Texas, USA
 Ballarat Clarendon College, a school in Australia

See also
 The Clarendon Academy
 Clarendon School
 Clarendon High School (disambiguation)
 Clarendon (disambiguation)